Akhuryan kayaran is an abandoned village in the Akhuryan Municipality of the Shirak Province of Armenia.

Demographics

References 

Former populated places in Shirak Province